Bergen Arts and Science Charter School (BASCS/Bergen ASCS) is a public charter school based in Garfield, New Jersey, United States. The school is a part of the North Jersey Arts and Science Charter Schools. The network consists of Bergen-ASCS Elementary in Garfield, Bergen-ASCS Middle High in Hackensack, and Passaic-ASCS Elementary and Building #2 in Passaic.

The school opened in September 2007 for grades K–5 and added a new grade every year until it reached the 12th grade. In 2011, it expanded with the establishment of the Bergen Arts and Science Charter School Middle High in Hackensack and Passaic Arts and Science School in Passaic. After the expansion was complete, Bergen Arts and Science Charter School moved its 7th and 8th grade to Bergen Arts and Science Charter School Middle High.

As of the 2021–22 school year, the school had an enrollment of 1,208 students and 74.0 classroom teachers (on an FTE basis), for a student–teacher ratio of 16.3:1. There were 448 students (37.1% of enrollment) eligible for free lunch and 163 (13.5% of students) eligible for reduced-cost lunch.

Expansion

In 2011, BASCS expanded into two new schools: BASCS Middle High and Passaic Arts and Science Charter School, bringing the charter's total number of schools to three. Both BASCS Middle High and Passaic Arts and Science Charter School began operating in the 2011–12 school year.

As of March 2020, the charter had a total of six schools: one in Clifton, three in Garfield, one in Hackensack, three in Passaic, two in Paterson, and three in Hudson.

Athletics
The mascot of BASCS is the Yellow Jacket. Athletically, the school participates in the North Jersey Interscholastic Conference, which is comprised of small-enrollment schools in Bergen, Hudson, Morris and Passaic counties and was created following a reorganization of sports leagues in Northern New Jersey by the New Jersey State Interscholastic Athletic Association (NJSIAA).

In the 2015–16 school year, the school had 187 students in grades 10–12. As such, the NJSIAA classified the school as North I Group I, a group that included schools with an enrollment of 187 to 490 students in that grade range, for most athletic competition purposes.

References

External links
 School website
 School Finder

Data for the Bergen Arts and Science Charter School, National Center for Education Statistics

Garfield, New Jersey
Hackensack, New Jersey
Lodi, New Jersey
2007 establishments in New Jersey
Charter schools in New Jersey
Educational institutions established in 2007
Public elementary schools in New Jersey
Public high schools in Bergen County, New Jersey
Public middle schools in New Jersey
K-12 schools in New Jersey
Charter K-12 schools in the United States